Kashubian Unity Day is an annual festival celebrated every March 19 to commemorate the first historical written mention of Kashubians, in Pope Gregory IX's Bull of 19 March 1238. In this bull, the Pope referred to Prince Bogislaw I of Pomerania (d. 1187) as duce Cassubie (duke of Kashubia).

Sponsored and coordinated by the Kashubian-Pomeranian Association, the annual Kashubian Unity Day is designed to promote Kashubian culture. It includes folk art fairs, exhibitions, crafts, and a tournament of the traditional Kashubian card game, "Baszka." Another, newer, feature is the competition to better the world record for the number of people simultaneously playing the accordion. Kashubian Unity Day is also noted for its use of social media to promote the event, and its Facebook page is a very useful source for both festival information and news pertaining to Kashubian life and culture.

Kashubian Unity Day has been held in the following locations:
 2005: Gdańsk 
 2006: Tuchomie
 2007: Kramarzyny
 2008: Miastko
 2009: Bytów
 2010: Kartuzy
 2011: Słupsk
 2012: Brusy
 2013: Kościerzyna
 2014: Sierakowice
 2015: Sulęczyno
 2016: Bojano
 2017: Chmielno
 2018: Kosakowo

See also
 World Congress of Kashubians in summer.

References

Kashubian culture
History of ethnic groups in Poland
Public holidays in Poland
March observances
Spring (season) events in Poland